Acanthodactylus longipes, commonly called the long fringe-fingered lizard, is a species of lizard in the family Lacertidae. The species is endemic to northwestern Africa.

Geographic range
A. longipes is found in Algeria, Chad, Egypt, Libya, Mali, Mauritania, Morocco, Niger, Tunisia, and Western Sahara.

Reproduction
A. longipes is oviparous.

References

Further reading
Boulenger GA (1918). "Sur les lézards du genre Acanthodactylus Wiegm." Bulletin de la Société Zoologique de France 43: 143–155. (Acanthodactylus scutellatus Var. longipes, new variety, p. 154). (in French).
Padial JM (2006). "Commented distributional list of the reptiles of Mauritania (West Africa)". Graellsia 62 (2): 159–178.
Salvador, Alfredo (1982). "A revision of the lizards of the genus Acanthodactylus (Sauria: Lacertidae)". Bonner Zoologische Monographien (16): 1–167. (Acanthodactylus longipes, pp. 132–136, Figures 86–88, Map 26). (in English, with an abstract in German).

Acanthodactylus
Reptiles described in 1918
Taxa named by George Albert Boulenger